Sahabi Tree, Tree of Al Buqayawiyya (The Blessed Tree) (Arabic شجرالمبارکہ) is a 1500 year old tree located in Safawi, Jordan. 156 km from Amman, the capital of Jordan.
The tree is a Atlantic Pistachio tree. It is located on the old trade route between Mecca and Damascus. Caravans used to travel by this route.

Religious importance
It is believed that one such caravan was going to Syria from Mecca, when Muhammad sat down under its shadow at the age of 12. He was accompanying his uncle Abu Talib. Under this tree, the monk Bahira foretold about the prophethood of Muhammad.

It is a tourist attraction in Jordan, with many Muslims visiting the tree every year.

Travelling
It is 156 Km from Jordan Capital Amman head towards the nearby city of Sahab, Jordan. There, you can visit the Cave of the Seven Sleepers.Then continue onwards for about 100 km to the city of Azraq. From Azraq, take the road north to Safawi  for about 30 km, which is about 14 km away toward al-Buqayawiyya.

Compound
King Abdullah of Jordan ordered to construct a fence around the tree to safeguard the tree.

See also
List of individual trees
Midh Ranjha Tree, Pakistan

References

Life of Muhammad
7th-century merchants
Miracle workers
Tourism in Jordan